Highway 180 (AR 180, Ark. 180, Hwy. 180, also officially Martin Luther King Jr. Boulevard) is a state highway of  in Fayetteville. The route begins at Interstate 49/US 62/US 71/Highway 16 and runs east through Fayetteville to School Avenue (former US 71 Business). Highway 180 is designated as part of the Trail of Tears National Historic Trail as well as Arkansas Heritage Trails System designations as the Butterfield Trail, Trail of Tears (Benge Route), and Civil War Trails (Herron's Approach).

Route description

Highway 180 begins at US 62 just underneath the Interstate 49/US 62/US 71/AR 16 overpass in western Fayetteville. It continues east to a junction with Razorback Road (former Highway 112) on the Campus of the University of Arkansas. Highway 180 continues east past the University of Arkansas, Fayetteville High School, and the Fayetteville National Cemetery to terminate at School Avenue (former US 71B). The roadway continues east as Martin Luther King Jr Boulevard, a city street. The route is entirely four lane, with a center left-turn lane.

History
As early as 1930, the road was named Wall Street in the city limits of Fayetteville. The road later became 6th Street. Between 1971 and 1989 this road was designated US 62 Business.

On January 15, 2009, Fayetteville renamed Sixth Street to Martin Luther King Jr. Boulevard. The ceremony took place at the Razorback Road intersection at the entrance to the University of Arkansas. Most Fayetteville businesses on the road still claim 6th Street, and many residents and university students continue to call the road 6th Street over two years after the change.

Major intersections

Former routes

Its original location was along Assembly Road and Skyline Drive where it circled around Mount Sequoyah and returned to its single terminus of Highway 45. This segment was dropped from the state highway system in the early 1990s.

The route began at U.S. Route 71 Business in Fayetteville and followed Township Road, Gregg Avenue and Drake Street before ending at AR 112. In the 1990s this segment was extended north along Gregg Avenue and ended at a spur of U.S. 71 Business on the north end of Fayetteville. This segment was dropped from the state highway system in 2008 following the widening of Gregg Avenue.

See also

References

External links

180
Fayetteville, Arkansas
Transportation in Washington County, Arkansas
Trail of Tears
180
U.S. Route 62
2008 establishments in Arkansas